The 1950 Iowa gubernatorial election was held on November 7, 1950. Incumbent Republican William S. Beardsley defeated Democratic nominee Lester S. Gillette with 59.10% of the vote.

Primary elections
Primary elections were held on June 5, 1950.

Democratic primary

Candidates
Lester S. Gillette, former State Senator
Myron J. Bennett

Results

Republican primary

Candidates
William S. Beardsley, incumbent Governor

Results

General election

Candidates
Major party candidates
William S. Beardsley, Republican
Lester S. Gillette, Democratic 

Other candidates
W. Raymond Picken, Prohibition
Howard H. Tyler, Independent

Results

References

1950
Iowa
Gubernatorial